The Sentinel is a  elevation Navajo Sandstone summit located near the Court of the Patriarchs in Zion National Park, in Washington County of southwest Utah, United States, that is part of the Towers of the Virgin. The national park map lists the elevation as 7,157-feet.

Description
It is set alongside the North Fork of the Virgin River which drains precipitation runoff from this mountain. Its neighbors include Bee Hive, Mount Spry, The East Temple, Mount Moroni, Mountain of the Sun, Twin Brothers, and the Three Patriarchs. This feature's name was officially adopted in 1934 by the U.S. Board on Geographic Names. In 1995, a landslide at the base of The Sentinel dammed the Virgin River and washed out a section of the park road. The Sentinel was once much bigger before a huge rock avalanche fell from it, when 4,800 years ago the Sentinel Slide with a volume of 286 million cubic meters {10.1 billion cubic feet) dammed the river, thereby creating Sentinel Lake which existed for 700 years and filled with sediments, creating Zion's flat valley.

Climate
Spring and fall are the most favorable seasons to visit The Sentinel. According to the Köppen climate classification system, it is located in a Cold semi-arid climate zone, which is defined by the coldest month having an average mean temperature below 32 °F (0 °C), and at least 50% of the total annual precipitation being received during the spring and summer.

Gallery

See also

 List of mountains in Utah
 Geology of the Zion and Kolob canyons area
 Colorado Plateau

References

External links

 Zion National Park National Park Service
 Weather: The Sentinel
 Sentinel Rock Climbing: mountainproject.com
 Flickr photo
 Sentinel Slide

Mountains of Utah
Zion National Park
Mountains of Washington County, Utah
Sandstone formations of the United States
North American 2000 m summits